Flindersia amboinensis is a species of plant in the family Rutaceae. It is found in Indonesia and Papua New Guinea. It is threatened by habitat loss.

References

amboinensis
Near threatened plants
Taxonomy articles created by Polbot